Mormyshka (or Mormishka, or Marmooska) is a sort of fishing lure or a jig. The word is derived from Russian word Mormysh meaning Freshwater Shrimp (Gammarus).

Mormyshka was invented in the 19th century in Russia. The prototypes were big spoon lures used for ice fishing. Trying to imitate shrimps, anglers made lures smaller and changed the way of fixing them on the line. As a result, efficient lures appeared and were spread quickly among ice fishermen all around Russia and Scandinavia.

Mormyshka consists of a metallic head, often made of tungsten, and a hook soldered in it. There is a small vertical hole in the middle of the head where the line passes through.

The way to knot Mormyshka to the line is unusual, but is not difficult. The line is put through the hole and tied to the hook.
When suspended, Mormyshka keeps an almost horizontal position, and the point of the hook is above its shank.

Some mormyshkas have a Bead Head on the hook.

In contrast to Jig Heads, original Russian Mormyshka jigs have no up eye;
Mormyshkas are not always globe-shaped. There are many forms that provide different presentations to fish;
Usually, high quality Mormyshka is not painted, but coated or plated with Nickel, Brass, Copper, Gold, Silver, or combination of two metals, that provides better attraction to fish.

For the past few years Mormyshka has been used in summer fishing as well with long poles and a float or a nod. It is used either with live bait or alone. Also, anglers use palmers tied on Mormyshkas.

References

External links
Mormyshka

Fishing equipment
Russian culture
Russian inventions